The Remedello culture (Italian Cultura di Remedello) developed during the Copper Age (4th and 3rd millennium BC) in Northern Italy, particularly in the area of the Po valley. The name comes from the town of Remedello (Brescia) where several burials were discovered in the late 19th century.

First excavations
The first burials were discovered in the winter of 1884, the excavations were initiated by Gaetano Chierici, but, as a result of the low temperatures, he fell ill and died. The excavations continued under the direction of Giovanni Bandieri, who moved the relics to the Museum of Reggio Emilia.

The burials
The Copper Age graves contained a single body in a crouching or supine position with the head facing north-west.

The male set was represented by arrows, stone daggers and polished stone axes, among the tombs few are those with axes and daggers or ornaments made of copper.

The female burials are accompanied by ceramic vessels or (in rare occasions) ornaments. The graves of children contained simple kits of flint stone.

Among the found items noteworthy is the presence of extremely accurate works in flint stone as axes and other weapons, objects in copper and arsenical silver (arms, pins, pectorals, bracelets), all of them characterized by decorative elements of eastern origin.

Genetics 
In a 2015 study published in Nature, the remains of three individuals ascribed to the Remedello culture were analyzed. All of them were determined to belong to haplogroup I.

Chronology
Although most of the discovered tombs date to the Chalcolithic, burials from the Bronze Age and the Iron Age have also been recovered.

The Remedello culture has been recently periodized by scholars into two distinct historical periods both dating back to the Copper Age.

Remedello I : 3400  / 3200 BC - 2800 BC, or ancient Copper Age stage;

Remedello II: 2900  / 2800 BC - 2400 BC, or full Copper Age stage.

Notes

See also

Bagnolo stele
Beaker culture
Chalcolithic
Prehistoric Italy

External links

Chalcolithic cultures of Europe
Archaeological cultures of Southern Europe
Archaeological cultures in Italy